Jim Perdue is an American businessman. He has been the chairman and advertising spokesperson of Perdue Farms since 1991. He is a third generation leader of the company founded by his grandfather in 1920.

Like his father, Frank, Jim Perdue grew up in the family business, but didn't decide to make it his business right away. He wanted to pursue his dream of becoming a marine biologist, and went on to earn his Ph.D. in fisheries. But in 1983, he accepted his dad's invitation to return to the family business, joining the company as an entry-level management trainee. After working many different management jobs in just about every area of the company, and earning his master's degree in business along the way, Jim became chairman in 1991 and also took over as advertising spokesman, appearing in  the company's TV commercials. He enjoys vacationing in Bethany Beach, Delaware. Jim Perdue started doing commercials with his dad in 1995. As of September 3, 2017, Jim can be seen doing commercials with his sons, Chris and Ryan Perdue, fourth generation in the family business.

References

Living people
American advertising people
American food industry business executives
American chairpersons of corporations
Year of birth missing (living people)
Perdue family